Furus also known as Phuroos or Furoos  is a village in Ratnagiri district, Maharashtra state in Western India. The 2011 Census of India recorded a total of 3255 residents in the village with total area 1062.35 hectares. It is predominantly populated by Konkani Muslims along with Hindu and Buddhist. Furus is believed to be named by Persians who came here to trade in horses (horse: فارسی Persian). The main language spoken in Furus is Kokni (not to be confused with Goan Konkani), a blend of Bankoti, Sangameshwari and Marathi infused with words of Arabic, Urdu and Persian origin.

History
Kokni Muslims trace their ancestry back to the Arab traders who arrived on the Western coast of India during the medieval era and Persians. Muslims first arrived in Konkan in 699, according to Jalal al-Din al-Suyuti, less than 70 years after the death of Muhammad in 632. Furus is believed to be visited by Dr. B. R. Ambedkar on 17 May 1937 on the way to Dapoli and spent a night at Buddhawadi, Furus

Location 
Furus is on State Highway SH104 between Khed and Dapoli. The nearest Railway Station is Khed which is 12 km away. 14 km. from Dapoli. Furus is situated beside the banks of a seasonal stream called locally as Patoli and is surrounded on all sides by low hills. It rains in plenty during Monsoon season. The temperature in Furus varies between 20 and 35 degrees. Ratnagiri District can be physically divided into 3 zones viz. Coastal, Middle and Hilly. Furus falls under Middle Zone. Middle zone is characterized by a medium altitude. It is more accessible due to the Bombay–Goa Highway as well as the Konkan railway.

Political Administration
Furus comes under the Konkan Division of Maharashtra State. It falls under the Raigad Lok Sabha Constituency and Dapoli Vidhan Sabha Constituency. Current MLA and MP representing Furus are below

Transportation 
Furus is well-connected by road to nearby big towns. State Highway 104, Khed to Dapoli passes from Furus. Besides buses are also available as per their timings auto-rickshaw are available round-the clock.

Educational facilities 

Furus was one of the first townships in the area to have a high school. S.I. High School & Junior College of Science, Furus was founded by "Adv. & ex MLA W. A. Parkar"
under a government initiative in 1938 (pre-independence time). The School was in English Medium named Anglo Vernacular High School and is still functional. Furus has following school

 Siraj-ul-Islam High School and Junior College
 CWS - Ideal English School

Economy 

Furus economy was hugely dependent on agricultural product till early 1980. Post 1980 most of the young earners head towards metro cities and hence agricultural production gets big hit in coming years. During the same period most of the people started to migrate to Gulf, UK, Canada, Australia, USA for the jobs. Presently 95% of Furus economy depend on remittance from foreign countries.

Healthcare Facilities  

Furus has government run Primary Health Center situated at Dayal Road. Apart from this Furus has one equipped private nursing home run by resident Dr. Antule and a small clinic run by visiting Dr. Chikhale.

Demographics 

Furus consist of 4 Sub-villages mentioned in Census 2011 viz., - Furus, Furus Gaonthan, Furus Amshet and Falsonda

Ratnagiri District and in particular Furus is one the very few place in India whose sex ratio stood at 1210 Females per 1000 males which means the females population is higher than males

The main religions here are Islam, Hinduism and Buddhism.
The Muslim community consists of 7 Sub Jamaats also called as Mohallas.
They are
Choughan (चौगन) mohalla
Fanaswad (फणसवाड)
Tahtani (तहतानी) mohalla
Tekdi (टेकडी) mohalla and
Aathvi (आठवी) mohalla
Falsonda (फल्सोंडा)
Navanagar (नवानगर) mohalla

Buddhist reside at 
Buddhawadi (बौद्धवाडी) 
Whereas people following Hinduism mostly reside at 
Nhavwadi (न्हाववाडी)
Chougulewadi (चौगुलेवाडी)
Gujarwadi (गुजरवाडी)
Bhuleshwarwadi (भुलेश्वरवाडी)
Kanganewadi (कांगणेवाडी)
Rewalewadi (रेवाळेवाडी)

See also
Ratnagiri
Konkani Muslim

References
General
http://wikimapia.org/1144914/Furus

http://www.mahapwd.com/gismaps/ratnagiri/default.htm

Specific

External links
https://web.archive.org/web/20140517132220/http://furus.in/
https://web.archive.org/web/20100823133058/http://www.fwskuwait.com/

Villages in Ratnagiri district